Otis is a city in Rush County, Kansas, United States.  As of the 2020 census, the population of the city was 296.

History
Otis was founded in 1886, and named for the founder's son, Otis Modderwell.

The first post office in Otis was established in August 1887.

Geography
Otis is located at  (38.534933, -99.052088).

Demographics

2010 census
As of the census of 2010, there were 282 people, 146 households, and 84 families residing in the city. The racial makeup of the city was 96.1% White, 0.4% African American, 0.7% Native American, 0.4% Asian, 0.7% from other races, and 1.8% from two or more races. Hispanic or Latino of any race were 2.5% of the population.

There were 146 households, of which 15.8% had children under the age of 18 living with them, 46.6% were married couples living together, 6.2% had a female householder with no husband present, 4.8% had a male householder with no wife present, and 42.5% were non-families. 40.4% of all households were made up of individuals, and 19.8% had someone living alone who was 65 years of age or older. The average household size was 1.93 and the average family size was 2.56.

The median age in the city was 52.7 years. 16% of residents were under the age of 18; 8.1% were between the ages of 18 and 24; 14.2% were from 25 to 44; 37.2% were from 45 to 64; and 24.5% were 65 years of age or older. The gender makeup of the city was 51.4% male and 48.6% female.

2000 census
As of the census of 2000, there were 325 people, 148 households, and 92 families residing in the city. The racial makeup of the city was 98.77% White, 0.31% Native American, 0.31% Asian, and 0.62% from two or more races. Hispanic or Latino of any race were 1.85% of the population.

There were 148 households, out of which 30.4% had children under the age of 18 living with them, 52.0% were married couples living together, 6.1% had a female householder with no husband present, and 37.8% were non-families. 35.1% of all households were made up of individuals, and 22.3% had someone living alone who was 65 years of age or older. The average household size was 2.20 and the average family size was 2.82.

In the city, the population was spread out, with 22.2% under the age of 18, 10.2% from 18 to 24, 21.8% from 25 to 44, 24.6% from 45 to 64, and 21.2% who were 65 years of age or older. The median age was 43 years. For every 100 females, there were 94.6 males. For every 100 females age 18 and over, there were 94.6 males.

The median income for a household in the city was $27,109, and the median income for a family was $35,625. Males had a median income of $26,875 versus $18,929 for females. The per capita income for the city was $14,290. About 4.5% of families and 6.5% of the population were below the poverty line, including 2.3% of those under age 18 and 15.3% of those age 65 or over.

Industry
The Linde Group, based in Munich, Germany, operates the world's second largest helium production facility in Otis, producing nearly one-sixth of the global supply of the gas.

Education
The community is served by Otis–Bison USD 403 public school district.  School unification consolidated Otis and Bison schools forming USD 403. The Otis-Bison High School mascot is Cougars.

Otis schools were closed through school unification. The Otis High School mascot was Eagles.

References

Further reading

External links
 Otis - Directory of Public Officials
 USD 403, local school district
 History of Cities in Rush County
 Otis Info, Legends of Kansas
 Rush County maps: Current, Historic, KDOT

Cities in Rush County, Kansas
Cities in Kansas